Hamra Street or Rue Hamra is one of the main streets of the city of Beirut, Lebanon, and one of the main economic and diplomatic hubs of Beirut. It is located in the neighborhood of the same name, Hamra. Its technical name is Rue 31. Due to the numerous sidewalk cafes and theatres, Hamra Street was the centre of intellectual activity in Beirut during the 1960s and 1970s. Before 1975, Hamra Street and the surrounding district was known as Beirut's trendiest, though in the post-war period it has arguably been eclipsed by Rue Monot in Ashrafieh, Rue Gouraud in Gemmayzeh, Rue Verdun, and downtown area.  In the mid 1990s, the Municipality of Beirut gave a facelift to the street to reattract tourists all year round. Hamra Street was known as Beirut's Champs Elysées, as it was frequented by tourists all year round.

Today it is a commercial district with numerous prestigious universities (such as: American University of Beirut, Lebanese American University, and Haigazian University), hotels, furnished apartments, libraries, restaurants and coffee shops, with "78 Street" (commonly known as "the Alleyway") being Hamra's main pubbing and clubbing hub.

Geography 
Hamra Street runs east-west, connecting Beirut Central District with the Ras Beirut neighborhoods. The street begins at the intersection of Rue de Rome and runs west until the intersection of Rue Sadat.  Hamra Street is also a walking distance from the American University of Beirut on Bliss Street, Haigazian University on Rue Michel Chiha and the campus of the Lebanese American University as well as Rue Jeanne d'Arc and René Moawad Garden on Rue Spears.

Demographics
The Los Angeles Times journalist and Pulitzer Prize winner Borzou Daragahi described the street as a bastion of liberalism [that] embraces multiple religions and political views; Hamra Street is an amalgam of all of Lebanon's religious groups, including Sunnis, Maronites, Melkites, Greek Orthodox Christians, Druze, and Shias. 

Hamra, however, remains Lebanon's secular haven, melting pot for free thinkers and the least religiously affiliated area around Beirut as the area hosts a limited number of churches and mosques.

Economy
It hosts a large number of western chains (including Gloria Jean's, Caribou Coffee, Costa Coffee and Starbucks), as well as many local shops and restaurants. The appropriately named Cafe Hamra is a restaurant celebrating the historic street with  an old street graffiti decor and a variety of international and Lebanese food as well as hookah smoking. Cafe Younes is another popular cafe that was first opened in 1935 and is run by a small family and is run by Amin Younes, the grandson of the founder of the same name. It is also known for its tourist appeal and variety of hotels. Its main landmark is the Crowne Plaza. The street buzzes with life during the summer when many tourists, especially from the Persian Gulf area, flock to Lebanon.

Before the Lebanese civil war, Hamra Street was known as Beirut's "Champs Elysées" as it was frequented by tourists all year round. Beirut's Piccadilly Theatre was one of the major theaters in the Middle East. Hamra Street is a first-rate commercial district which proudly displays the latest fads in fashion. It also hosts a good number of hotels, furnished apartments and coffee shops that cater to visitors and students from the nearby American University of Beirut, Lebanese American University and Haigazian University.

Hamra no longer functions as the cosmopolitan bastion of sectarian Lebanon. The Lebanese civil war and the ensuing government regulation that enforced rent control on all of the buildings removed the neighborhood's elite, pre-war cachet. However, the neighborhood remains trendy and profitable because of:
the historical significance of the neighborhood;
the attraction of "authentic" Beirut to foreign tourists, particularly those from the Persian Gulf;
the historic Hamra red light / supernightclub district, and the present acceptability of opening pubs, bars, and public cafes that serve alcohol in the district;
the current locations of the Lebanese Central Bank (Banque Du Liban), many private banks, multiple major newspapers (As-Safir, the wartime and pre-war headquarters of An-Nahar, and the near neighbors Al-Akhbar and Al-Mustaqbal), and many Lebanese government ministries (including the Ministries of Interior, Information, Tourism, and Economy and Trade), which have existed in Hamra since before the civil war;
the close proximity and economic focal points of four of Lebanon's most significant universities: the American University of Beirut, the Lebanese American University, and Haigazian University.
the booming commercial scene in Hamra St. that is a combination of retail shops, cafes, and restaurants.

Although it has yet to revive fully its pre-war legacy, Hamra Street has undergone many renovations and is still regarded by many as the heart of the city. While it is no longer the nightlife and commercial center of Beirut, it has become one of many pocket areas and streets scattered throughout the city, and is included with other streets and areas as Rue Monot, Rue Gouraud, and Rue Verdun.

Hamra Street Festival
Hamra Streets Festival is launched in the autumn of each year under the patronage of the Prime Minister. It is a convivial and cultural festival, its aim is to exhibit the cultural and artistic diversity of Lebanon in general and Hamra Street in particular.
The festival has encompassed a vast number of activities and events that target all age groups. Participation in the festival is flexible, and it greatly encourages amateur musicians, Artists and Free-lancers in all fields of the Arts. A wide variety of professional musicians perform after 8:30 p.m. each night while Amateurs reign the stages during the day. The Inauguration & Carnival Parade includes Carnival Float (Char de Carnaval), Dancing Groups, Zaffee loubnaniyya, Harley Davidson Owners HOG, The Beirut Orchestra, University Clubs Parade, Firemen, Croix Rouge Libanaise, Fuel Tankers with donkeys, Vegetable Chariots, Street Artists (Fire eater, stilt walker, etc.), Vintage Car etc. and a firework show afterwards.
More Activities:

 Promotional offers from Hamra Streets Shops, Restaurants, Bars and Coffee Shops.
 Biggest concert in Lebanon on three stages; around 40 local professional groups were announced from Rock, Blues, RAP, Electro, Jazz, Fusion, Oriental, all style are represented showing variety of a true Lebanese Bands!
 Arts and Crafts Stands: Artists and Amateurs will get a chance to show their works such as jewelry, accessories, T-shirt print-mugs, artisans at work etc. with the participation of the Lebanese Handicraft Group.
 NGO and Awareness Stands: Will be present such as Arc-en-ciel, Lebanese School For The Blind and Deaf, Ahlieh School, Nahawa al Mouwatiniyeh and others.
 Photography and Paintings Exhibitions in all the streets with the participation in photography of Laki Hamra’I/Spread Minds and Mazen Jannoun as well as our contestants. Painters will have opportunity to exhibit their paintings all around Hamra Street.
 Short Films Screenings in zawareebs of Hamra: Short Movies, mainly produced by students of LAU, IESAV and other universities to be confirmed. A contest is being set up for best short documentary.

Events
Opening of American University of Beirut on Bliss Street at the end of the 19th century.  
One of the Arab region's most dynamic areas.  Frequented by the Arab region's most prominent writers, intellectuals, artists such as the Palestinian national poet Mahmoud Darwish, Syrian poets Nizar Qabbani and Omar Abu Risha, Muhammad al-Maghut, Ounsi el-Hajj and Mohammed Moftahh Elfitory.
First act against the Israeli occupation of Southern Lebanon in 1982 at the Wimpy Cafe.
Christopher Hitchens described Hamra street by saying: "As Arab thoroughfares go, Hamra Street in the center of Beirut is probably the most chic of them all. International in flavor, cosmopolitan in character, it boasts the sort of smart little café where a Lebanese sophisticate can pause between water-skiing in the Mediterranean in the morning and snow-skiing in the mountains just above the city in the afternoon. “The Paris of the Middle East” used to be the cliché about Beirut: by that exacting standard, I suppose, Hamra Street would be the Boulevard Saint-Germain."

See also
Theatre of Lebanon

References

Streets in Beirut
Shopping districts and streets in Lebanon
Tourist attractions in Beirut
Retailing in Lebanon
Restaurant districts and streets in Lebanon